Raúl Pérez may refer to:

 Raúl Pérez (boxer) (born 1967), Mexican boxer
 Raúl Pérez (rugby player) (born 1965), Argentine rugby union player
 Raúl Adolfo Pérez (born 1939), Argentine footballer
 Raúl Pérez Varela (1925–?), Argentine basketball player
 Raúl Pérez (Chilean footballer), Chilean footballer